Thara Memory was a trumpeter and educator from Eatonville, Florida. He attended Alabama State University and Marylhurst University. He lived in Portland, Oregon, United States from the 1970s until his death in  2017. His daughter, Tahirah Memory, is an internationally known jazz vocalist.

Biography
In 2005, he founded the American Music Program Pacific Crest Jazz Orchestra (often shortened to American Music Program), a youth jazz orchestra in Portland, Oregon, that has won national accolades. During the 2012 Portland Jazz Festival, Memory was honored as 2012's Portland Jazz Master. Memory was a member of the Oregon Music Hall of Fame.

On February 10, 2013, Memory won a Grammy Award in the Best Instrumental Arrangement Accompanying Vocalist(s) category for his arrangement for the Esperanza Spalding track "City of Roses" from her album Radio Music Society, which featured the students of the American Music Program in the music video and backing up Spalding on the album.

On May 9, 2014, Berklee College of Music awarded Memory an honorary doctorate of music degree. Memory's message to the students was direct and sharp, a piece of wisdom from a seasoned educator. "You can't keep it unless you give it away. Start giving it away as soon as you walk out this door. Rehearsal every day is the answer. If you rehearse every day, you have nothing to worry about."

On May 9, 2015, the American Music Program, which Memory still directed at the end of his life despite his failing health, won Jazz at Lincoln Center's Essentially Ellington high school jazz band competition, playing Ellington's "Tattooed Bride" from memory.

At the time of his death he had been under arrest, after being charged with 8 counts of sexual abuse and assault.

Memory died on June 17, 2017 at the age of 68.

Discography
 Juke Music - Flying Heart Records, 1992
 Chronicle - CD Baby, 2008

References

Further reading 
 Thara John Memory, Oregon Encyclopedia

1940s births
2017 deaths
Musicians from Portland, Oregon
Place of birth missing
Year of birth missing
American jazz musicians
People from Eatonville, Florida
American jazz trumpeters
American male trumpeters
Alabama State University alumni
Marylhurst University alumni
American male jazz musicians